Josef Zemp (2 September 1834, in Entlebuch – 8 December 1908) was a Swiss politician and member of the Swiss Federal Council (1891–1908).

On 17 December 1891, he was the first member of a conservative party to be elected to the Federal Council of Switzerland. He was affiliated to the Christian Democratic People's Party of Switzerland. He left office on 17 June 1908, only a few months prior to his death.

During his time in office he held the following departments:
 Department of Posts and Railways (1892–1901)
 Political Department as President of the Confederation (1902)
 Department of Posts and Railways (1903–1908)
He was President of the Confederation twice in 1895 and 1902.

External links

1834 births
1908 deaths
People from Entlebuch District
Swiss Roman Catholics
Christian Democratic People's Party of Switzerland politicians
Foreign ministers of Switzerland
Members of the Federal Council (Switzerland)
Members of the Council of States (Switzerland)
Members of the National Council (Switzerland)
Presidents of the National Council (Switzerland)
Heidelberg University alumni
Ludwig Maximilian University of Munich alumni